Rusi Jeejeebhoy (born 2 December 1942) is an Indian former cricketer. He played first-class cricket for Bengal between 1965 and 1973. Jeejeebhoy was educated at Calcutta Boys' School and the University of Calcutta. He toured the West Indies in 1970-71 as India's reserve wicket-keeper, but did not play Test cricket.

See also
 List of Bengal cricketers

References

External links
 

1942 births
Living people
Indian cricketers
Bengal cricketers
Cricketers from Kolkata
University of Calcutta alumni